is a public park in Edogawa Ward and Kōtō Ward, Tokyo, Japan.

Overview
The park is mainly composed of a lawn plaza and a sports plaza, and is a place of relaxation for locals.

History
The area around the park (Hirai, Ōjima, Komatsugawa) is at an altitude of 0 m above sea level, so the park was constructed by raising the land on a large scale and the park was set as an evacuation site for use in times of disaster.

Environmental issue
Formerly an industrial area, it was the site where a large amount of chrome slag was buried by chemical manufacturers in the 1970s. Treatment of the slag by Kōtō Ward is said to have been completed in 2000, but a paper published in 2014 reported that some leaked during heavy rain and snowfall.

Access
 By train: 3 minutes’ walk from Higashi-ojima Station on the Toei Shinjuku Line

See also
 Parks and gardens in Tokyo
 National Parks of Japan

References

 Website of Tokyo Metropolitan Park Association (in Japanese)

External links
 Website of Tokyo East Park
Parks and gardens in Tokyo